Baccharis salicina  is a species of plant in the family Asteraceae. Common names include willow baccharis, and Great Plains false willow. It is a shrub found in North America where it grows in mildly saline areas.

Description
Baccharis salicina is a shrub producing erect, branching stems approaching 4 metres (13 ft) in maximum height. The thick leaves are oblong to oval in shape and sometimes have roughly toothed edges. They may be up to 7 centimetres (2.8 in) long. The shrub is dioecious, with male and female plants producing flower heads of different types. The head is enclosed in a layer of phyllaries and the female flowers yield fruits, each an achene with a white pappus about a centimeter long.

The earliest name for the species is Baccharis salicifolia Nutt., coined in 1840. This name, however, had previously been used for some South American material, so the North American plants needed to be renamed as Baccharis salicina.

Distribution and habitat
The plant is native to the United States (southern Great Plains region and Southwestern United States; states of California, Nevada, Arizona, Colorado, Kansas, New Mexico, Oklahoma, Texas, and Utah and northern Mexico (Baja California, Chihuahua, Coahuila, Nuevo León, Durango, Sonora).

The plant grows on open sandy flood plains, most commonly in mildly saline areas.

References

External links

salicina
Flora of North America
Plants described in 1840